Destrose was a Japanese heavy metal band formed in 2007. The group remained an independent band their entire career and experienced frequent line-up changes until going on indefinite hiatus in 2015. Although considered pioneers of the Girls Metal Band Boom, Destrose never achieved commercial success and is best known for the subsequent bands later formed by its many members.

History

2005–2012: Formation and singles
Guitarist and bandleader Mina formed a cover band named Destroya in December 2005. She derived its name from Kiss' album Destroyer and the Godzilla character Destoroyah. They performed songs by acts such as Led Zeppelin, Show-Ya, Pantera, Metallica and Manowar. Mina formed Destrose in March 2007, including "rose" in the name to make it more feminine and in reference to Guns N' Roses. Destrose contributed the song "Headless Goddess" to the November 2008 compilation album Samurai Metal Vol. 4. Eye, Eri, Kayo and guest drummer Mari all left the band on New Year's Eve 2008 and went on to form Mary's Blood at the end of 2009. In January 2010, Destrose was the opening act for The Iron Maidens' Japanese tour. Before the release of their debut single "Hakai no Bara" on October 2, a second pressing was already decided due to excessive demand.

Destrose's song "Skykiller" was included on the January 15, 2011 compilation Iron Angel in preparation for their January 22 performance at the two-day Iron Angel Live event alongside other female metal acts such as Taia and Dazzle Vision. The band recruited vocalist Nene and drummer Nana in March 2011. Nene is also a fortuneteller and would give tarot card readings at concerts. The single "Deathless Memories" was released on May 25 and reached number 8 on Oricon's independent singles chart. Destrose announced they would temporary suspend activities after their September 25 concert at Meguro Live Station and that it would be their last with Nene, Nana and guitarist Satty. Bassist Miho joined Destrose on November 11. Marina joined about a week later and would become their longest serving vocalist.

Destrose resumed activities after the January 9, 2012 Women's Power 20th Anniversary concert, where they played alongside Show-Ya, Aldious and Babymetal. Two days later, drummer Haruna officially joined the band. They released "Fenixx -To Revive-" on March 28, which reached number 7 on the indie chart. Its title is not only a reference to the band resuming, but also refers to Japan's recovery from the March 2011 Great East Japan Earthquake. Guitarist Narumi officially joined the band on June 1. The single "Nostphilia", coined by combining "nostalgia" and "philia", was released on November 14.

2013–2015: Studio album and hiatus

The band's only studio album, the self-titled Destrose, was released on April 10, 2013 and supported by a fourteen-date Japanese tour that ended with their first one-man concert on June 1 at Meguro Live Station. It reached number seven on Oricon's indie albums chart. They were the only indie band at Show-Ya's female artists-only Naon no Yaon 2013 festival on April 29, which also included Scandal and Cyntia among others. Destrose performed in the US for the first time in early August as part of Tokyo in Tulsa. The double A-side single "Rin / Maze" was released on November 13 and reached number 7 on the indie chart. To celebrate, they held a one-man concert at Shibuya O-West that same day, which was recorded and later released as a concert video. Later that month, Mina announced she was taking a hiatus from live activities due to health issues.

In March 2014, Destrose performed in the US again at Naka-Kon. Soon after Marina left and formed Mardelas, with Lisa replacing her on April 25. The mini-album, The Prologue was released on September 24  and reached number 5 on the indie chart. Each member wrote a song for the record, which was supported by an eleven-date nationwide tour. Drummer Haruna left the band after her farewell concert on December 24 at Meguro Rock-May-Kan due to her upcoming marriage.

Risa☆Risa joined as drummer on January 30, 2015, and had her first Destrose concert the following day. In February, leader and sole constant member Mina left the band due to her ongoing health issues. At the same time Lisa went on hiatus to treat vocal cord nodules, with Ibuki filling in as guest vocalist. In May, Destrose announced that they would be going on indefinite hiatus in July. They played their final concert, titled Persistence of Rose, at Meguro The Live Station in Tokyo on July 18, 2015.

Also in July 2015, Mina formed the steampunk metal band Fate Gear. Their debut album A Light in the Black, released the following month, and their third album, 2018's 7 Years Ago, both include re-recordings of Destrose songs. Their 2019 EP Headless Goddess is composed almost entirely of re-recorded Destrose songs and features guest vocalists, including Ibuki. In September 2015, Narumi and Risa☆Risa formed Disqualia with Ibuki. Miho and Haruna formed Lovebites in 2016 and recorded the unreleased Destrose song "Bravehearted" for their 2017 debut, The Lovebites EP.

Members

 Eye – vocals (2007–2008)
 Eri – guitar (2007–2008)
 Kayo – bass (2007–2008)
 Mary – vocals (2009–2010)
 Saki – guitar (2009–2010)
 Ami – bass (2009–2011)
 Emi – drums (2009–2011)
 Akane – vocals (2010–2011)
 Satty – guitar (2010–2011)
  – vocals (2011)

 Nana – drums (2011)
  – guitar (2011–2012)
 Marina – vocals (2011–2014)
 Haruna – drums (2012–2014)
  – guitar (2007–2015)
 Miho – bass (2011–2015)
  – guitar (2012–2015)
  – vocals (2014–2015)
 Risa☆Risa – drums (2015)

Timeline

Discography

Albums

Singles

Video albums

References

External links

Japanese heavy metal musical groups
Musical groups from Tokyo
Musical groups established in 2007
All-female bands
Musical groups disestablished in 2015